Soma Chhaya Bhatia (musically known Baby Brat) is an American-Canadian actress and musician, known for her roles such as Goldi Nahir in Degrassi: Next Class and Shauzia in the Oscar nominated film The Breadwinner.

Biography
Soma Chhaya became interested in singing at the age of ten, but held off on pursuing a career due to intense stage fright. "I grew up with stage fright, to the point where I’d run off the stage crying. So acting came a lot easier because I just had to stand there and talk, I didn’t even have to be myself." She began to pursue acting "by accident" as a way of getting comfortable with being in front of people. She ultimately found the craft invigorating and credits it to helping her career. Chhaya's career took off when she was cast as Goldi Nahir in Degrassi: Next Class. She found the character interesting in that it taught her about feminism. After her stint on the show, she continued to stay in contact with her co-stars. She joined the cast of the animated film The Breadwinner which connected with Chhaya due to her grandmother having gone through a similar situation as the main character of the film. She is set to play the lead role of Selene in the new film Clan of the Vein which will begin filming mid 2020.

Chhaya decided to try her hand at music again in 2016 and joined Canada's Music Incubator. She has since released 13 singles most of which she was involved with both writing and producing as well as directing videos for those singles.

In 2021, she started using the name Baby Brat for her musical career. She approached her re-branding by having her new musical identity, Baby Brat, poison herself in her self produced single and music video titled The Death Of Soma Chhaya. Her first single as Baby Brat debuted in October 2021. She describes her Baby Brat music as a hard hitting hyper-pop sound with satirical, theatrical and brash lyrics. She has since released 13 more singles, including XTC debuted at the top of the Spotify  Hyperpop  playlist in April 2022.

However, post pandemic, Chhaya has stepped back into acting with productions finally opening up again landing 5 roles in 2022. Of which, she landed her first starring role in the UPTV Christmas movie Christmas on the Slopes. She stars as the main character Sophia Grewal, a celebrity chef who takes her first real Christmas vacation after a disappointing restaurant opening and an embarrassing break-up. She is mistaken for the sous chef by the head chef and finds herself falling in love with cooking again and the head chef.

Soma Chhaya is also set to appear in the upcoming NBC TV show The Irrational as the character Jasmine. The pilot is scheduled to premier late 2023.

Between filming both projects Soma Chhaya developed her own acting school,  Academy Actor , in which she teaches classes for actors in audition technique, character development and career planning.

Personal life

Chhaya attended John Fraser Secondary School in Mississauga, ON graduating in 2016.

Chhaya is an advocate for living a vegan lifestyle, having been a vegan since she was 14, and was raised as a vegetarian from birth.

Chhaya moved to Los Angeles in January 2019 to attend the Fashion Institute of Design and Merchandising for Marketing.

Filmography

Singles

References

External links

Soma Chhaya @ Academy Actor

Living people
Canadian actresses of Indian descent
Canadian film actresses
Canadian television actresses
Canadian voice actresses
21st-century Canadian actresses
Year of birth missing (living people)